A Rogue in Love is a 1922 British silent film directed by Albert Brouett and starring Frank Stanmore, Ann Trevor and Gregory Scott.

Cast
 Frank Stanmore as Frank Badgery  
 Ann Trevor as Pattie Keable  
 Gregory Scott as Joe Bradwick  
 Fred Rains as Joseph Keable  
 Lawford Davidson as Ray Carrell  
 Betty Farquhar as Eudocia  
 Kate Gurney as Landlady

References

Bibliography
 Goble, Alan. The Complete Index to Literary Sources in Film. Walter de Gruyter, 1999.

External links
 

1922 films
1922 drama films
British drama films
British silent feature films
Films set in England
Films based on British novels
British black-and-white films
1920s English-language films
1920s British films
Silent drama films